Sir James Ulick Francis Canning Alexander  (10 February 1889 – 4 April 1973) was a British Army officer, businessman and courtier in several of the Royal Households of the United Kingdom.

Early life and education
He was the son of James Alexander and Lady Emily Boyle, daughter of Richard Boyle, 9th Earl of Cork. He was educated at Eton College, before attending the Royal Military College, Sandhurst.

Career
In 1909 Alexander commissioned into the Coldstream Guards. He first saw active service during the First World War, during which he was attached to the Egyptian Army and was mentioned in dispatches. In 1919 he made an Officer of the Order of the British Empire in recognition of his wartime service. Between 1920 and 1921 he was Military Secretary for the Egyptian Army. From 1923 to 1925 he served as Political Secretary to Alexander Cambridge, 1st Earl of Athlone while he was Governor-General of the Union of South Africa. In 1925 he was invested as a Member of the Royal Victorian Order.

Between 1928 and 1936 Alexander was Comptroller of the Household to Prince George, Duke of Kent, and was made a CVO in 1932. In 1934 he was made a Companion of the Order of St Michael and St George. In 1936 Alexander held the office of Keeper of the Privy Purse and Extra Equerry to Edward VIII, and he retained the role during the reign of George VI from 1936 to 1952; among his duties was allocating 'Grace and Favour' Apartments in the Royal Palaces.  In 1937 he was knighted as KCVO, and he was made Knight Commander of the Order of the Bath in 1947. He was furthered honoured as a GCVO in 1948. Also in 1948 he received the King George VI Version of the Royal Household Long and Faithful Service Medal for 20 years of service to the British Royal Family. 

Following the accession of Elizabeth II, Alexander became an Extra Equerry in her household and a Privy Councillor in 1952. In 1953 he was honoured as a GCB.

From 1952 to 1957 he was Chairman of Tanganyika Concessions, and served as its director from 1957 to 1963. From 1952 to 1964 he was director of the Benguela Railway Company, and from 1954 to 1963 he was director of the Union Minière du Haut Katanga. In 1957 he served as a director of the Banque Belge.

Marriage
Alexander married Lady Mary Beatrice Thynne, daughter of Thomas Thynne, 5th Marquess of Bath and Violet Caroline Mordaunt, on 27 November 1947.

References

1889 births
1973 deaths
British Army personnel of World War I
20th-century British businesspeople
Companions of the Order of St Michael and St George
Coldstream Guards officers
English courtiers
Equerries
Graduates of the Royal Military College, Sandhurst
Knights Grand Cross of the Order of the Bath
Knights Grand Cross of the Royal Victorian Order
Members of the Privy Council of the United Kingdom
Officers of the Order of the British Empire
People educated at Eton College